CoRoT-22b is a transiting exoplanet found by the CoRoT space telescope in 2011 and confirmed in 2014.

It is a hot and small (smaller than Uranus) gas giant planet orbiting a G0IV star with Te = 5939K, M = 1.099M☉, R = 1.136R☉, and above-solar metallicity. It has an estimated age of between 1.3 and 5.3 Gyr.

References

Hot Jupiters
Transiting exoplanets
Exoplanets discovered in 2011
22b